Clearing is the debut studio album of multidisciplinary artist Hayden Dunham, under their musical alias Hyd. It was released on November 11, 2022, via PC Music. The album was many years in the making, with songs being premiered live as far back as 2018. Material from the album was recorded on Spanish island Lanzarote, which Hyd has stated served as strong inspiration for the album's natural and environmental themes and soundscapes. The album features contributions from the late Sophie, as well as A. G. Cook, Jónsi, and Caroline Polachek, among others.

It was supported by the singles "Afar", "So Clear", "Breaking Ground" and "Fallen Angel".

Background and release 
Dunham created the QT project alongside friends in 2014: PC Music founder A. G. Cook and Sophie. The project included the single "Hey QT", and DrinkQT, a Red Bull-esque energy drink with a design by Kim Laughton. The music and drink were intended to be two manifestations of the same product. The song has widely celebrated since its release, and is often credited for what catapulted PC Music's success.

Hyd first emerged in 2020, on Cook's 7G and Apple albums. "Airhead", from the latter album, interpolates melodies from "Breaking Ground". In 2021, Hyd released "No Shadow" as the lead single to their self-titled EP, which came out later that year in November. In an interview with Caroline Polachek in December 2021, Hyd confirmed they were working on music with Alex Somers and Hannah Diamond.

The lead single "Afar" was released in July 2022, featuring production from Polachek. Hyd performed at Pitchfork Music Festival the same month, where she shared some of the album's songs. The title track "So Clear" released later in September, alongside the album and a tour announcement. "Breaking Ground" and "Fallen Angel" were also later released as singles.

Track listing 

Notes
  signifies an additional producer
  Thy Slaughter is a duo formed by Easyfun and A. G. Cook.

Release history

References 

2022 debut albums
Albums produced by A. G. Cook
Albums produced by Sophie (musician)
Albums produced by Caroline Polachek
PC Music albums